Joseph Keaveny is an American attorney, banker, and politician who served as a member of the Missouri Senate for the 4th district from 2009 to 2016. After leaving the Senate, he was appointed to serve as Administrative Law Judge of the Missouri Department of Labor.

Early life and education 
Judge Keaveny is one of six children born to the late John Joseph and Mary Justine Keaveny. He grew up in the city's Skinker DeBaliviereneighborhood and is a graduate of Christian Brothers College High School. He earned a Bachelor of Science degree in accounting from the University of Missouri–St. Louis, followed by a Master of Science degree in finance and a Juris Doctor from Saint Louis University.

Career 
Keaveny has worked in the banking industry, managing portfolios for high-worth individuals and later managing U.S. Securities and Exchange Commission (SEC) compliance issues for U.S. Bancorp. For several years, he volunteered as a board member for the Skinker-DeBaliviere Housing Corporation — learning first-hand the challenges of rebuilding derelict properties, which led to a strong advocacy for state Historic Tax Credits.

During his tenure on the Skinker-DeBaliviere Community Council, Keaveny spent time working with the St. Louis Metropolitan Police Department on public safety issues — an experience that reinforced his belief that the City of St. Louis must regain local control of its police force, a position opposed by the St. Louis Police Officers' Association.

Missouri Senate 
Keaveny was elected to the Missouri Senate to represent the citizens of the 4th Senatorial District, which includes downtown and eastern St. Louis City, during a special election on November 3, 2009, to fill an unexpired term. On July 7, 2016, Keaveny resigned his position in the Missouri Senate after being appointed by Missouri Governor Jay Nixon (D) to serve as an administrative law judge at the Department of Labor.

Committees 

Financial and Governmental Organizations and Elections
 Health, Mental Health, Seniors and Families
 Judiciary and Civil and Criminal Jurisprudence
 Veterans' Affairs, Pensions and Urban Affairs
 Educated Citizenry 2020 Committee
 Joint Committee on Education
 Joint Committee on Public Employees Retirement
 Joint Interim Committee on Oversight of Federal Stimulus and Stabilization Funds
 Governor's Council on Physical Fitness and Health
 Health Care Stabilization Fund Feasibility Board

Personal life 
Keaveny and wife Karen have four grown children: Shannon, Lauren, Joseph and Ellen.

References

Official Manual, State of Missouri, 2009-2010. Jefferson City, MO:Secretary of State.

External links
Missouri Senate - Joseph Keaveny official government website

1956 births
Living people
Politicians from St. Louis
University of Missouri–St. Louis alumni
Saint Louis University alumni
Missouri state court judges
Democratic Party Missouri state senators